An Oscar Peterson Christmas is a 1995 album by Oscar Peterson.

Track listing
 "God Rest Ye Merry, Gentlemen" (Traditional) – 3:24
 "What Child Is This?" (William Chatterton Dix, Traditional) – 4:47
 "Let It Snow! Let It Snow! Let It Snow!" (Sammy Cahn, Jule Styne) – 3:39
 "White Christmas" (Irving Berlin) – 3:48
 "Jingle Bells" (James Pierpont) – 3:12
 "I'll Be Home for Christmas" (Buck Ram, Kim Gannon, Walter Kent) – 2:46
 "Santa Claus Is Coming to Town" (J. Fred Coots, Haven Gillespie) – 3:28
 "O Little Town of Bethlehem" (Phillips Brooks, Lewis Redner) – 3:16
 "The Christmas Waltz" (Cahn, Styne) –	6:50
 "Have Yourself a Merry Little Christmas" (Ralph Blane, Hugh Martin) – 3:55
 "Silent Night" (Franz Gruber, Josef Mohr) – 3:07
 "Winter Wonderland" (Richard B. Smith, Felix Bernard) – 4:06
 "Away in a Manger" (Traditional) – 3:33
 "O Christmas Tree" (Traditional) – 2:19

Personnel

Performance
 Oscar Peterson – piano
 Dave Samuels – vibraphone (3, 4, 7, 10, 12)
 Jack Schantz – flugelhorn (5, 6, 13)
 Lorne Lofsky – guitar
 David Young – double bass
 Jerry Fuller – drums
 String orchestra conducted and arranged by Rick Wilkins

References

1996 Christmas albums
Christmas albums by Canadian artists
Oscar Peterson albums
Telarc Records albums
Jazz Christmas albums